Arsen Ghazaryan (born 15 February 1978 in Ararat, Armenian SSR) is an Armenian retired road bicycle racing cyclist. He competed at the 1996 Summer Olympics.

References

External links

Sports-Reference.com

1975 births
Living people
People from Ararat, Armenia
Armenian male cyclists
Olympic cyclists of Armenia
Cyclists at the 1996 Summer Olympics